The Apprentice of Florence by Anne Dempster Kyle is a children's historical novel set in 15th century Italy and Constantinople. It was published in 1933 and was a Newbery Honor recipient in 1934. The book is illustrated by Erick Berry.

The novel is set principally in 1453, the year when Constantinople fell to the besieging Turks. It follows the adventures of sixteen-year-old Nemo, apprenticed to a silk merchant of Florence, who accompanies the merchant's son to Constantinople on business.

References

1933 American novels
1933 children's books
Children's historical novels
American children's novels
Newbery Honor-winning works
Novels set in Florence
Novels set in Istanbul
Novels set in the 1450s
Fiction set in 1453